The 1919 Columbus Panhandles season was their 14th season in existence. It was also the last time that the team played in the Ohio League, before joining the early National Football League the following year. The team posted a 3-6-1 record.

Regular season

Schedule

Game summaries

Game 3: at Akron Indians 
October 12, 1919, at Liberty Park

Following the tie to the Mark Greys, the Panhandles played against the Indians at Liberty Park.  The Panhandles played a strong defensive game, but the offense was weak. According to the Youngstown Vindicator, Brown for Akron was the "star of the game", "shaking defenders" for "fifty-yard gains." The quarters for 12.5 minutes long; and the Panhandles lost 13–0.

References

Pro Football Archives: 1919 Columbus Panhandles season

Columbus Panhandles seasons
Columbus Pan
Columbus Pan